Bumperhead is a graphic novel by American cartoonist Gilbert Hernandez, published by Drawn & Quarterly in 2014.

The 120-page, five-chapter graphic novel follows its aimless protagonist from elementary school to middle age.  Bobby Numbly grows up in Oxnard, California—Hernandez's own hometown.  His nickname "Bumperhead" is slang for someone who copies all that he sees others doing.  The first chapter looks at his early childhood; the second his teenage years, when he gets into drugs and sex and listens to glam and prog rock; the third his aimless early adulthood; the fourth his punk-rock early 20s; and the last his middle-aged adulthood.

References

Works cited

 
 
 

2014 graphic novels
American graphic novels
Gilbert Hernandez
Drawn & Quarterly titles